McGrath is a city in Aitkin County, Minnesota, United States. The population was 80 at the 2010 census.

History
James E. McGrath, a logger and landowner who had been working the area since 1895, donated 40 acres in 1907 for a town site. The site was platted as Elmwood. When a post office was established in 1908, the site was renamed McGrath after James E. McGrath. McGrath was incorporated in 1923.

Geography

McGrath is located along Minnesota State Highways 27 / 65 (co-signed). State Highway 18 is nearby. Other routes include Aitkin County Road 9, 1st Street.

The Snake River and Bear Creek both flow nearby. The Soo Line ATV Trail is also nearby.

Demographics

2010 census
As of the census of 2010, there were 80 people, 32 households, and 19 families living in the city. The racial makeup of the city was 96.3% White, 1.3% Native American, and 2.5% from two or more races.

There were 32 households, of which 15.6% had children under the age of 18 living with them, 46.9% were married couples living together, 6.3% had a female householder with no husband present, 6.3% had a male householder with no wife present, and 40.6% were non-families. 34.4% of all households were made up of individuals, and 12.5% had someone living alone who was 65 years of age or older. The average household size was 2.16 and the average family size was 2.79.

The median age in the city was 51 years. 11.2% of residents were under the age of 18; 5.2% were between the ages of 18 and 24; 23.8% were from 25 to 44; 30.1% were from 45 to 64; and 30% were 65 years of age or older. The gender makeup of the city was 58.8% male and 41.3% female.

2000 census
As of the census of 2000, there were 65 people, 26 households, and 13 families living in the city. The racial makeup of the city was 93.85% White, 1.54% African American, 1.54% Asian, and 3.08% from two or more races. Hispanic or Latino of any race were 15.38% of the population. 72.3% were of German, 10.6% Norwegian, 6.4% Czech and 6.4% Danish ancestry according to Census 2000.

There were 26 households, out of which 23.1% had children under the age of 18 living with them, 46.2% were married couples living together, 3.8% had a female householder with no husband present, and 50.0% were non-families. 42.3% of all households were made up of individuals, and 15.4% had someone living alone who was 65 years of age or older. The average household size was 2.50 and the average family size was 3.69.

In the city, the population was spread out, with 32.3% under the age of 18, 7.7% from 18 to 24, 23.1% from 25 to 44, 23.1% from 45 to 64, and 13.8% who were 65 years of age or older. The median age was 39 years. For every 100 females, there were 80.6 males. For every 100 females age 18 and over, there were 91.3 males.

The median income for a household in the city was $24,250, and the median income for a family was $23,750. Males had a median income of $23,750 versus $0 for females. The per capita income for the city was $9,540. There were 18.2% of families and 12.7% of the population living below the poverty line, including no under eighteens and none of those over 64.

References

External links
McGrath Photo Gallery

Cities in Aitkin County, Minnesota
Cities in Minnesota